Hals Pass (el. 662 m.) is a low mountain pass in the Austrian Alps in the Bundesland of Lower Austria.

It connects the Triesting River valley near Pottenstein with the Piesting River valley near Pernitz.

The road was built in 1828.

See also
 List of highest paved roads in Europe
 List of mountain passes

Gutenstein Alps
Mountain passes of the Alps
Mountain passes of Lower Austria